Nick Weiler-Babb (born December 12, 1995) is an American-born naturalized German professional basketball player for Bayern Munich of the German Basketball Bundesliga (BBL) and the EuroLeague. He played college basketball for Iowa State.

Early life and high school career
Weiler-Babb, born in Topeka, Kansas and moved to Texas when he was young. He is the son of Mike Babb, who owns Babb Brothers BBQ and Blues in Dallas, Texas. He is the younger brother of professional basketball player Chris Babb. Weiler-Babb attended Martin High School in Arlington, Texas. As a senior, he averaged 16 points, eight rebounds and eight assists per game. On August 11, 2013, Weiler-Babb committed to Arkansas over offers from SMU and Texas A&M.

College career
As a freshman, Weiler-Babb averaged 0.7 points and 0.8 rebounds per game in 4.7 minutes per game for the Razorbacks. Following the season, he decided to transfer to Iowa State and sat out the 2015–16 season as a redshirt. Weiler-Babb averaged 4.0 points and 3.1 rebounds per game as a redshirt sophomore. On November 16, 2017, Weiler-Babb recorded a career-high 23 points, seven rebounds and seven assists in a 104–98 win against Appalachian State. He was named MVP of the Puerto Rico Tipoff as well as Big 12 player of the week. As a junior, Weiler-Babb averaged 11.3 points, 7.0 rebounds and 6.8 assists per game, shooting 44.7% from the floor and 32.3% from three-point range. He missed the final six games of the season due to knee tendonitis and a back injury. Weiler-Babb averaged 9.1 points, 5 rebounds and 4 assists per game as a senior on a team that won the Big 12 Tournament. He was named All-Big 12 Honorable Mention.

Professional career
After going undrafted in the 2019 NBA draft, Weiler-Babb played for the Miami Heat in the NBA Summer League. On July 27, 2019, Weiler-Babb signed with Riesen Ludwigsburg of the German Basketball Bundesliga. He posted a triple-double of 10 points, 11 rebounds and 12 assists in a 94–80 home win against Telekom Baskets Bonn on October 5.

On July 24, 2020, Weiler-Babb signed a two-year deal with Bayern Munich of the Basketball Bundesliga (BBL) and the EuroLeague. On July 8, 2022, he re-signed with the club until the end of the 2023–2024 season.

National team career
After obtaining German citizenship in the summer of 2022, he got called up to the German national basketball team by head coach Gordon Herbert. He represented Germany at the EuroBasket 2022, helping the team to a historic third place finish.

Career statistics

EuroLeague

|-
| style="text-align:left;"|2020–21
| style="text-align:left;" rowspan=3|Bayern
| 33 || 13 || 23.6 || .348 || .340 || .807 || 3.2 || 2.2 || 1.2 || .2 || 6.3 || 7.1
|-
| style="text-align:left;"|2021–22
| 29 || 16 || 26.2 || .427 || .292 || .875 || 4.2 || 2.9 || 1.1 || .2 || 6.2 || 9.2
|-
| style="text-align:left;"|2022–23
| 11 || 8 || 26.1 || .388 || .370 || .667 || 3.7 || 1.7 || 1.0 || .5 || 8.3 || 8.6
|- class="sortbottom"
| style="text-align:center;" colspan=2| Career
| 73 || 37 || 25.0 || .385 || .332 || .812 || 3.7 || 2.4 || 1.2 || .3 || 6.6 || 8.2

References

External links
Iowa State Cyclones bio
EuroLeague profile
RealGM profile

1995 births
Living people
American expatriate basketball people in Germany
American men's basketball players
Arkansas Razorbacks men's basketball players
Basketball players from Texas
FC Bayern Munich basketball players
Iowa State Cyclones men's basketball players
Riesen Ludwigsburg players
Shooting guards
Small forwards
Sportspeople from Arlington, Texas